Piletocera xanthosoma is a moth of the family Crambidae described by Edward Meyrick in 1886. It is found on Fiji, Tonga and Samoa.

Larvae have been recorded feeding on Zingiber officinale (ginger) produce. However, it is an accidental contaminant rather than a pest of the crop. Females have been recorded as laying eggs on exposed produce in lighted dock sheds.

References

x
Moths of Oceania
Moths of Fiji
Fauna of Samoa
Fauna of Tonga
Moths described in 1886